Moccasin, an unincorporated community in Tuolumne County, California, is located at the intersection of State Route 49 and State Route 120. The community is sited on the shore of Moccasin Reservoir at the edge of Lake Don Pedro.  The town is home to a State of California Resources Agency, Department of Fish and Game fish hatchery.

A fire July 3, 2006, burned  near Moccasin Powerhouse according to the California Department of Forestry. The three million dollar fire involved 40 engines, 4 helicopters, and 9 bulldozers.

Hetch Hetchy Relationship
A company town, Moccasin is almost entirely owned by the City and County of San Francisco. Homes are used for employees who work on the Hetch Hetchy Water & Power system. Most buildings are painted the same color and homes in the community look similar as a result. There are no stores or gas stations.

Construction on the original Moccasin Powerhouse, designed by San Francisco architect Henry A. Minton, was started in Fall 1921. The facility was completed and began generating power on August 14, 1925.
Paul James Ost was the electrical engineer put in charge of power operations and electrical engineering phases of the Hetch Hetchy project. 
The original powerhouse was removed from operation February 7, 1969.

The present-day Moccasin Powerhouse was completed and placed in operation January 27, 1969. The facility's rated capacity is 100,000 kVA and there is a second 3,000 kVA generator called Moccasin Low Head Generating Plant, (completed 1986). The town site is a significant facility along the Hetch Hetchy Aqueduct system.

History
During the Gold Rush, the locale was a stage coach stop on Big Oak Flat Road. A covered bridge was built to allow crossing of Moccasin Creek during the wet season. There was a mining camp along Moccasin Creek and east of town along Priest Grade. Robberies were frequent during years when gold miners were successful in the area.

Priest Grade and Old Priest Grade
It is common to see vehicles with smoking brakes descending the old grade. During summer, ambient temperatures can be in the 90~100 °F range. In these temperatures, many vehicles overheat climbing the old grade. For this reason, bottles of water are available at turnouts along Old Priest Grade to fill overheating vehicles. A sign on Highway 120 also advises drivers to turn off air conditioning in order to prevent overheating while climbing either grade. Locals tell stories of car accidents in history where the vehicles left the path of Old Priest Grade and tumbled into Grizzly Gulch. The hillsides are sturdy chaparral with thick vegetation. The terrain was so difficult that, in a few cases, the cars and bodies were not retrieved, some locals claim. Construction to widen curves and add guard rails began in July 2010.

Government

References

External links
 Pictures of Moccasin
 California Department of Fish and Game Trout Hatchery
 California Rainfall Data for Moccasin

Unincorporated communities in Tuolumne County, California
Hetch Hetchy Project
Company towns in California
Populated places established in 1921
Unincorporated communities in California